Sócrates Brasileiro Sampaio de Souza Vieira de Oliveira (19 February 1954 – 4 December 2011), simply known as Sócrates , was a Brazilian footballer who played as a midfielder. His medical degree and his political awareness, combined with style and quality of his play, earned him the nickname "Doctor Socrates".

Easily recognizable for his beard and headband, Sócrates became the "symbol of cool for a whole generation of football supporters". He is considered to be one of the greatest midfielders of his generation. In 1983, he was named South American Footballer of the Year. In 2004, he was named by Pelé in the FIFA 100 list of the world's greatest living players.

Socrates played for Brazil for seven years, scoring 22 goals and representing the nation in two World Cups. He  captained the team in the 1982 FIFA World Cup; playing in midfield alongside Zico, Falcão, Toninho Cerezo and Éder, considered one of the greatest Brazilian national teams ever. He also appeared in the 1979 and 1983 Copa América. At club level, Sócrates played for Botafogo-SP before joining Corinthians in 1978. He moved to Italy to play for Fiorentina, returning to Brazil in 1985 to end his career.

Playing career

Club career
Sócrates was born in Belém do Pará. He began playing football professionally in 1974 for Botafogo-SP in Ribeirão Preto, but spent the majority of his career (1978 to 1984) with Corinthians, scoring 41 goals in 59 Brazilian Série A games, and 172 goals in 297 matches in total.

In 1984–85, aged 30, Sócrates had his first experience abroad, playing in Italian Serie A with Fiorentina. He returned to his country after that sole season, representing Flamengo, Santos and former club Botafogo-SP, and retiring in 1989. During his period in Flamengo, he played 20 games, scoring 5 goals and won Campeonato Carioca: 1986.

In 2004, more than a decade after retiring, 50-year-old Sócrates agreed to a one-month player-coaching deal with Garforth Town of the Northern Counties East Football League in England. He made his only appearance for the club on 20 November, against Tadcaster Albion, coming on as a substitute twelve minutes from time.

International career
Sócrates was capped 60 times for Brazil between May 1979 and June 1986, scoring 22 goals. He captained the national team at the 1982 FIFA World Cup, and also appeared in the 1986 World Cup in Mexico. In the latter edition, he scored twice, starting with the game's only goal against Spain in the group stage. he added another in the round-of-16 4–0 win over Poland, shooting his penalty kick without running; in the following game, against France, he tried to convert it in the same fashion, but had his shootout attempt saved by goalkeeper Joël Bats; France ultimately progressed to the semi-finals.

Sócrates also represented his country at the 1979 and 1983 Copa América tournaments. In the latter he appeared in only one game, the second leg of the final against Uruguay (1–1 home draw, 1–3 aggregate loss).

Style of play
A former centre-forward, who later made a name for himself as a midfielder, playing in either an attacking or central midfield role, Sócrates was an elegant, talented, and technical playmaker, known for his great through passes, precise long balls, link-up play, and his vision on the field, as well as his physical strength; he was also a two-footed player. While he was mainly known for his ability to orchestrate attacking plays, he was a prolific goal scorer himself, courtesy of his powerful and accurate shot with his right foot, and his ability to make attacking runs into the area from behind. He was also an accurate penalty taker, while his height, heading ability, and elevation allowed him to excel in the air. He was also known, however, for often not taking part in his teammates' celebrations whenever he scored a goal. Although he was not the quickest of players, and preferred to play the game at a slower tempo, he possessed good acceleration. His intelligence and ability to read the game were also highly valued, and his signature move was the blind or "no-look" back-heel pass.

Sócrates was a key member of the Brazilian national team of the early to mid-1980s; Jonathan Wilson said that "Socrates was the brain of Brazil. He might not quite have had the flair of Zico, but he was the central intelligence". Former coach at Fiorentina, Giancarlo De Sisti, said: "Socrates was a very intelligent man, he had great class." In addition to his playing ability and intelligence, he was known for his correct behaviour and charismatic presence on the pitch, as well as his leadership in the dressing room, which made him a respected figure among his teammates, while his height, headband, hairstyle, and beard made him a highly recognisable figure on the pitch. He also often stood out for his outspokenness, humour, eccentric personality, his strong, rebellious character, and his left-wing political views, often speaking out against political issues in his home-country. However, he was equally notorious for not being particularly hard-working or disciplined in his personal life, as he smoked and drank large quantities of beer, once commenting: "I am an anti-athlete. I cannot deny myself certain lapses from the strict regime of a sportsman. You have to take me as I am."

Personal life
Sócrates was the firstborn child of Raimundo and Guiomar Vieira. He was born in Belém, Pará, and relocated with his family to Ribeirão Preto, São Paulo, in January 1960 after his father Raimundo earned an important position as revenue supervisor. This job earned Sócrates' father the status of a small-town hero in Igarapé-Açu, where the family lived at the time. His father's new salary allowed Sócrates to attend the best school in Ribeirão Preto, Colégio Marista. In a biography written by the journalist Tom Cardoso, it is revealed that the small library Sócrates' father had built in his home, containing philosophy books and other works, came under threat as of the coup d'état on 31 March 1964. Sócrates watched his father rid himself of books that he so loved; "In 1964, I saw my father tear many books, because of the coup d'état. I thought that was absurd, because the library was the thing he liked best. That was when I felt that something was not right. But I only understood much later, in college." At age 10, Sócrates was exposed to the repercussions of the military dictatorship's censorship. His childhood was marked by this event which he came to comprehend as an adult later in life.

Sócrates married four times. He divorced three times and died in his fourth marriage. He had six children. He was a columnist for a number of newspapers and magazines, writing not only about sports, but also politics and economics. He frequently appeared on Brazilian TV programmes as a football pundit. At the time of his death, Sócrates was writing a fictional book about the 2014 World Cup in Brazil.

Sócrates was a physician, a rare achievement for a professional footballer (he held a bachelor's degree in medicine from the Faculdade de Medicina de Ribeirão Preto, the medical school of the University of São Paulo). Even rarer is the fact that he earned the degree while concurrently playing professional football. After retiring as a player he practised medicine in Ribeirão Preto.

He was also noted for being an intellectual, a heavy drinker and a smoker. His younger brother Raí was also a footballer and an attacking midfielder, being a member of the Brazilian team that won the World Cup in 1994, notably playing for São Paulo and for Paris Saint-Germain.

Politics
During his time at Corinthians, Sócrates co-founded the Corinthians Democracy movement, in opposition to the then-ruling military government. Sócrates and his teammates protested against the regime's treatment of footballers, and showed support to the wider movement for democratisation, by wearing shirts with "Democracia" written on them during games.

On 16 April 1984 he spoke out in support of Diretas Já (Free Elections Now), a popular movement that called for direct presidential elections. In Socrates and the Corinthians' Democracy<ref>https://www.aljazeera.com/program/football-rebels/2013/5/3/socrates-and-the-corinthians-democracy. Al Jazeera English, 3 May 2013 (aprt of the Football Rebels series)</ref> Juca Kfouri, a Brazilian journalist, recalls how, "Socrates took the risk of saying, in front of two million people gathered on the cathedral square, that if direct presidential elections weren’t accepted by the regime, he’d go play in Italy." By hinging his transfer abroad on the outcome of a constitutional amendment, Socrates' political legacy began to form. His denunciation of the military dictatorship and fight to redemocratize Brazil extended his legacy beyond the football field.

Sócrates stated that three of his childhood heroes were Fidel Castro, Che Guevara and John Lennon. He was also a member of the Brazil Workers' Party, and said that "Lula was good" but that he had "earned a mere seven or so out of ten" for his way of governing Brazil.

Death and tributes
In 2011, Sócrates' health started to deteriorate. His use of alcohol has been linked to this. On 19 August 2011, he was admitted to the intensive care unit of the Albert Einstein Hospital in São Paulo with gastrointestinal bleeding secondary to portal hypertension and was discharged nine days later. The following month he spent 17 days in hospital with a liver ailment. On 1 December 2011, he was hospitalised with food poisoning which developed into septic shock and he was put on life support. He died on 4 December 2011 at the age of 57. He was survived by his wife and six children.

President of Brazil, Dilma Rousseff, paid tribute, saying Brazil had lost "one of its most cherished sons". "On the field, with his talent and sophisticated touches, he was a genius. Off the field... he was active politically, concerned with his people and his country."

Corinthians fans held up signs in tribute and there was a moment of silence before the team's match against Palmeiras (a 0–0 draw which secured Corinthians their first Brazilian title for six years). The result matched a professed desire of Sócrates, who had once stated his wish "to die on a Sunday when Corinthians won a trophy". Fiorentina held a minute's silence before their league match against Roma, and the players wore black armbands in tribute.

Former Brazil striker Ronaldo tweeted: "Sad start to the day. Rest in peace Dr. Socrates." Zico called him "unique". Italy's Paolo Rossi described the death as "a piece of our history that's broken off and gone away". Garforth chairman Simon Clifford paid tribute to the "great grace" of Sócrates.

Legacy
Pelé named Sócrates in the FIFA 100 list of the world's greatest living players in March 2004 and World Soccer named him one of 100 best footballers in history. In October 2008, he was inducted into the Pacaembu Brazilian Football Museum Hall of Fame.

Career statistics

Club

International

Honours

Botafogo-SP
Torneio Vicente Feola: 1976

Corinthians
Campeonato Paulista: 1979, 1982, 1983

Flamengo
Taça Rio: 1986
Campeonato Carioca: 1986

Brazil
Copa América: Runner-up 1983; Third-place 1979

Individual
Brazilian Football Museum Hall of Fame
FIFA 100World Soccer: 61st Greatest Player of the 20th Century
Campeonato Paulista top scorer: 1976
Bola de Prata: 1980
FIFA XI: 1982
South American Footballer of the Year: 1983
FAI International Football Awards – International Personality: 2007
 World Soccer'': World Team of the Year 1982

References

External links

 
 
 Garforth debut photo gallery at BBC
 
 

1954 births
2011 deaths
Sportspeople from Belém
People from Ribeirão Preto
Brazilian footballers
Association football midfielders
Campeonato Brasileiro Série A players
Botafogo Futebol Clube (SP) players
Sport Club Corinthians Paulista players
CR Flamengo footballers
Santos FC players
Serie A players
ACF Fiorentina players
Garforth Town A.F.C. players
Brazil international footballers
1982 FIFA World Cup players
1986 FIFA World Cup players
1979 Copa América players
1983 Copa América players
Brazilian expatriate footballers
Expatriate footballers in Italy
Expatriate footballers in England
Expatriate football managers in Ecuador
Brazilian expatriate sportspeople in Ecuador
Brazilian expatriate sportspeople in Italy
South American Footballer of the Year winners
FIFA 100
Brazilian columnists
20th-century Brazilian physicians
University of São Paulo alumni
Deaths from cirrhosis
Botafogo Futebol Clube (SP) managers
L.D.U. Quito managers
Associação Desportiva Cabofriense managers
Brazilian football managers
Brazilian socialists